Bunker Hill Community College (BHCC) is a public community college with multiple campuses in the Greater Boston area. Founded in 1973 in the Charlestown neighborhood of Boston, Massachusetts, BHCC provides higher education and job training services at two campuses and three satellite locations.

BHCC is the state's largest community college, enrolling more than 13,000 students in day, afternoon, evening, late-evening, weekend, in web-based and distance-learning courses. It is also one of the state's most diverse institutions of higher education: 24% of the students are African-American, 24% are white or caucasian, and 24% Latino. More than half are women. Students' average age is 27. The college enrolls more than 800 international students who come from about 100 countries and speak more than 75 languages.

Overview

Bunker Hill Community College's  main campus is in Boston's Charlestown neighborhood, on the site of the former Charlestown State Prison that closed in 1955. It is served by the MBTA Orange Line rapid transit station called Community College, and sits near the site of the 1775 Battle of Bunker Hill in the American Revolutionary War. Bunker Hill Community College is accredited by the New England Commission of Higher Education.

Since 1987, a second campus has provided higher education and job training to residents of Chelsea, Revere, Everett, East Boston, Winthrop and other surrounding communities. This campus moved several time until settling in 1998 into a former post office in Bellingham Square. The two-story 1910 brick structure  had been vacant for a decade before being donated to the Commonwealth of Massachusetts.

In Boston's South End, BHCC worked with Inquilinos Boricuas en Acción (IBA), a community-based organization, to establish the Pathway Technology Campus (PTC) in Villa Victoria, a predominantly-Latino affordable-housing community. PTC helps residents of the South End and Lower Roxbury earn a GED certificate, take adult education (ESL, Basic English and Math) classes, and to enroll in community college-level classes.

Since 2007, BHCC has operated an East Boston Satellite campus at the Education and Training Institute of the East Boston Neighborhood Health Center. It offers introductory and allied health courses in the evening during the fall, spring and summer terms.

Established in fall 2009, the Malden Satellite is based at Malden High School in Malden, Massachusetts, and offers introductory and college-level courses in the evening during the fall and spring semesters.

In recent years, the institution has rapidly gained recognition in the city, the state, and beyond as its graduates transferred into more prestigious programs elsewhere. It has been hailed for its innovative distance learning methods and workforce education. The college was awarded nearly $2 million in federal funds from the United States Department of Education to boost graduation rates among first-time, full-time students. BHCC was recently awarded an Achieving the Dream grant from the Lumina Foundation which will dedicate up to $450,000 toward supporting student success at the college.

The college was featured in the 1997 movie Good Will Hunting, as the location where Dr. Sean Maguire (Robin Williams) teaches. BHCC behavioral science chairperson, John P. Reeves, served as a model for Williams’ Maguire.

On July 1, 2013, Dr. Pam Y. Eddinger became BHCC's seventh president, replacing Dr. Mary L. Fifield, who retired after 16 years.

Notable alumni 
 Dana Rosenblatt, boxer
 Jopino Scarcella, boxer, Actor
 Stephen Stat Smith, state representative
 Bob Kelly, comedian.
Dane Cook, comedian.
 Tamerlan Tsarnaev, perpetrator of the Boston Marathon bombing - Attended for three semesters, and did not finish
 BB02, Nigerian singer and record label boss

References

External links 
 Official website

 
Community colleges in Massachusetts
Educational institutions established in 1973
Universities and colleges in Boston
1973 establishments in Massachusetts
Charlestown, Boston
Education in Malden, Massachusetts
Chelsea, Massachusetts
East Boston
Buildings and structures in Malden, Massachusetts
NJCAA athletics